Jurupa Hills High School is a public high school in Fontana, California. It has been open since August 9, 2010 and is the newest high school in the city of Fontana.

See also 
List of Riverside County, California, placename etymologies#Jurupa

References

External links 
 

Education in Fontana, California
High schools in San Bernardino County, California
Public high schools in California
2010 establishments in California